Sebastien Chaule (born 14 December 1976 in Agen) is a German international rugby union player, playing for the TSV Handschuhsheim until 2012 in the Rugby-Bundesliga and the German national rugby union team. His greatest success as a national team player was the promotion to Division 1 of the European Nations Cup in 2008.

He plays rugby since 1981 and originally hails from France. His usual position is outside-centre.

His last game for Germany was against Russia on 2 May 2009 in Hannover, his 15th international. He retired from international rugby after a controversial red card he received in a Bundesliga match in October 2009. Since 2012 his now playing for the Team Allgäu Rugby Kempten in the Bavarian division.

Chaule is a surgery Operation Assistant by profession

Honours

Club
 German rugby union championship
 Runners up: 2005, 2008
 German rugby union cup
 Winner: 2005
 German rugby sevens championship
 Winner: 2004, 2008

National team
 European Nations Cup - Division 2
 Champions: 2008

Stats
Sebastien Chaule's personal statistics in club and international rugby:

Club

 As of 30 April 2012

National team

European Nations Cup

Friendlies & other competitions

 As of 6 March 2010

References

External links
 Sebastien Chaule at scrum.com
   Sebastien Chaule at totalrugby.de

1976 births
Living people
French rugby union players
German rugby union players
Germany international rugby union players
Sportspeople from Agen
TSV Handschuhsheim players
RG Heidelberg players
Rugby union wings
Naturalized citizens of Germany